Kaihua County is a county under the jurisdiction of Quzhou city in Zhejiang Province of the People's Republic of China. It is located in the westernmost portion of Zhejiang, and is the source of the Qiantang River. The district's total area is 2224 square kilometers, and its population is 340,000 people. The district's postal code is 324300.  The district government is located at 54 Jiefang Street, in the town of Chengguan. Forests cover 79.2% of Kaihua County, making it a key county for forestry in Zhejiang and in China as a whole.

Gutianshan National Nature Reserve is located within Kaihua County.

Administrative regions

The county administers nine towns and nine rural villages.

Towns: Chengguan, Huabu, Majin, Chihuai, Cuntou, Tongcun, Yanglin, Suzhuang, and Qixi.

Rural villages: Yinkeng, Linshan, Zhongcun, Jincun, Zhangwan, Changjiang, Hetian, Tangwu, and Daxibian.

Climate

Tourist attractions
Qianjiangyuan National Forest Park is a famous scenic spot in the county.

References

 
County-level divisions of Zhejiang
Quzhou